"Trashed" is the opening song and first single from the 1983 album Born Again by English rock band Black Sabbath.

Background
Vocalist Ian Gillan composed the lyrics to "Trashed" after taking a car belonging to drummer Bill Ward without permission and crashing it during an alcohol-fuelled joyride around the grounds of the recording studio. Gillan recounts:

The owner of the car was not amused by the mishap. "I remember the night that Ian crashed that car…" Ward remarked. "I know why that car crashed and I didn't find it amusing anymore. I went through hell behind narcotic and alcohol addiction, and so things [like] 'I crashed my car, man', I take these things real serious now. It's not fun for me at all… I'm not saying that the song was glamorized, but I prefer not to glamorize it."

"Trashed" was released as a single with an accompanying music video. The track was one of many targeted by the PMRC and was included on the group's "Filthy Fifteen" list due to its subject matter.

The song was re-recorded by Gillan for his solo album Gillan's Inn, with Tony Iommi, Ian Paice and Roger Glover. This version reappeared on the 2011 compilation Ian Gillan & Tony Iommi: WhoCares.

Track listing
"Trashed" – 3:56
"Stonehenge" – 4:52

References

External links
Trashed info

1983 singles
Black Sabbath songs
Songs based on actual events
Songs written by Ian Gillan
Songs written by Tony Iommi
Songs written by Geezer Butler
Songs written by Bill Ward (musician)
1983 songs
Vertigo Records singles
British hard rock songs